Do Something Wrong is the first EP released by electronica band Psapp.

Track listing

Personnel

Carim Clasmann
Galia Durant

Notes
"Calm Down" was later released on Tiger, My Friend.
"Biskitt" was later released on Early Cats and Tracks.
"Dad's Breakdown" and "Northdown C" were later released on Early Cats and Tracks Volume 2.
"Dad's Breakdown" features spoken word vocals performed by Durant's father.
A song entitled "Do Something Wrong" would appear the following year on Psapp's Rear Moth EP and later on Early Cats and Tracks.

External links
Psapp official website 
Psapp at Domino Records

Psapp albums
2003 EPs